Boddie is a surname. Notable people with the surname include:

James R. Boddie, American electrical engineer
Nick Boddie Williams (1906–1992), American journalist and novelist
Tony Boddie (born 1960), American football player
Van Buren Boddie (1869-1928), American politician from Mississippi
Whitney Boddie (born 1987), American basketball player